The 1989 Lilian Cup was the 8th and final season of the competition. The four top placed teams from the previous season took part in the competition.

The competition was held in as a straight knock-out competition, with the two top placed teams from the previous season being seeded. The semi-final was played on 11 October 1989 and the final on 28 November. For the first time since the competition began, no 3rd-place match was played.
 
The competition was won by Hapoel Petah Tikva, who defeated Beitar Tel Aviv 4–2 in the final.

Results

Semi-finals

Final

Notes

References

Lilian 1989
Lilian Cup